This is a list of broadcast television stations that are licensed in the U.S. state of Arizona.

Full-power stations
VC refers to the station's PSIP virtual channel. RF refers to the station's physical RF channel.

Defunct full-power stations
 Channel 3: KCDA - Independent - Douglas (2/27/1961-10/8/1961)
 Channel 4: KTFL - FamilyNet - Flagstaff (1/1/2002-6/1/2006)
 Channel 9: KCFG - Independent - Flagstaff (12/20/2000-9/6/2012)
 Channel 10: KOY-TV - ABC - Phoenix (10/19/1953-5/5/1954, shared time with KOOL-TV)
 Channel 11: KIVA - ABC/CBS/NBC - Yuma (10/8/1953-1/31/1970)
 Channel 11: KYMA-DT - NBC - Yuma (1988-2020)
 Channel 40: KPOL - Independent - Tucson (1/1/1985-10/17/1989)

LPTV stations

Translators

See also
 Television stations in Sonora and Television stations in Baja California for stations across the Mexican border serving US cities
 List of Spanish-language television networks in the United States

Arizona

Television stations